Barentsia is a genus of Entoprocta belonging to the family Barentsiidae.

The genus has cosmopolitan distribution.

Species

Species:

Barentsia aggregata 
Barentsia antarctica 
Barentsia benedeni

References

Entoprocta